Billy Bland (April 5, 1932 – March 22, 2017) was an American R&B singer and songwriter.

Life and career
Bland, the youngest of 19 children, first sang professionally in 1947 in New York City, and sang with a group called The Bees in the 1950s on New Orleans's Imperial Records. In 1954, "Toy Bell" by the group caused some unrest by veering into the dirty blues genre. Dave Bartholomew brought them to New Orleans, where they recorded a song he had written and recorded twice before: firstly in 1952 for King Records as "My Ding-a-Ling," and later that year for Imperial as "Little Girl Sing Ting-A-Ling." Bland later pursued a solo career.

In 1960, Bland heard Titus Turner recording the song "Let the Little Girl Dance" in the studio, and demonstrated for Turner how to sing it (along with guitarist Mickey Baker and other session musicians). The event was recorded by record producer Henry Glover, and was eventually released as a single. The tune was a hit in the US, peaking at number 11 on the US Billboard R&B chart. and number 7 on the Billboard Hot 100. Bland had two other minor hits that year, "Harmony" (U.S. Hot 100 number 91) and "You Were Born to Be Loved" (U.S. Hot 100 number 94). He recorded until 1963 for Old Town, and then quit the music industry.

In the 1980s, he ran a soul food restaurant in Harlem.

Bland died on March 22, 2017, at age 84.

Discography

Singles

References

External links
 

1932 births
2017 deaths
American soul singers
Singer-songwriters from North Carolina
African-American male singer-songwriters
People from Wilmington, North Carolina
20th-century African-American male singers
21st-century African-American male singers